William H. Claypoole (March 7, 1907 – February 25, 1981) was a Republican member of the Pennsylvania House of Representatives.  William "Bill" Claypoole was born in Worthington, Pennsylvania to Charles Claypoole and Anna Elizabeth (Bowser) Claypoole. He was educated in the local schools and was later a resident of Kittanning, Pennsylvania.

References

Republican Party members of the Pennsylvania House of Representatives
1907 births
1981 deaths
20th-century American politicians